Ipueiras is a municipality in the state of Ceará in the Northeast region of Brazil. The population as of 2020 is 38,114.

See also
List of municipalities in Ceará

References

Municipalities in Ceará